Guðmundur Bragason (born 21 April 1967) is a former Icelandic professional basketball player and coach. He spent most of his career with Grindavík in the Icelandic Úrvalsdeild, winning the national championship there in 1996.

Icelandic National Team
Guðmundur is the highest capped player in the Icelandic national basketball team history, playing 164 games between 1987 and 2003.

Team of the 20th century
In 2001 Guðmundur was voted to the Icelandic team of the 20th century in basketball as a player.

Personal life
Guðmundur is married to Stefanía Jónsdóttir, a former member of the Icelandic women's national basketball team He is the father of basketball players Jón Axel Guðmundsson and Ingvi Þór Guðmundsson.

References

External links
Úrvalsdeild stats

1967 births
Living people
Centers (basketball)
Gudmundur Bragason
Gudmundur Bragason
Gudmundur Bragason
Gudmundur Bragason
Gudmundur Bragason
Gudmundur Bragason
Gudmundur Bragason
Gudmundur Bragason
Gudmundur Bragason
Gudmundur Bragason